Progreso Airport  is an airport serving the Apere River village of Progreso in the Beni Department of Bolivia.

See also

Transport in Bolivia
List of airports in Bolivia

References

External links 
OpenStreetMap - Progreso
OurAirports - Progreso
Progreso Airport
HERE Maps - Progreso

Airports in Beni Department